Por Andalucía is an Andalusian-based electoral alliance formed by Podemos, United Left/The Greens–Assembly for Andalusia (IULV–CA), Equo, Green Alliance (AV), Más País and Andalusian People's Initiative (IdPA) to contest the 2022 Andalusian regional election. The alliance was launched after over two months of negotiations between the parties to the left of the Spanish Socialist Workers' Party of Andalusia (PSOE–A), in an attempt to form a joint list that avoided wasted votes; however, both the new Adelante Andalucía party of Teresa Rodríguez, as well as the Andalusian Andalucía por Sí (AxSí)—which had been a founding member of the Andaluces Levantaos alliance between Más País, IdPA and itself—rejected joining in. 

An early agreement was concluded in late March 2022, and by April 2022 the new joint alliance of all these parties (with the exception of Adelante Andalucía and AxSí) was given the name Por Andalucía (Spanish for "For Andalusia"),. Controversy ensued as the role Podemos would play in the coalition, if any, became unclear. This conflict became more evident when the party presented its own prospective candidate, Juan Antonio Delgado, with no guarantees of participating in the coalition being given. A last-minute electoral coalition was reached between Podemos, IULV–CA, Greens Equo, Green Alliance (AV), Más País and Andalusian People's Initiative (IdPA), but because Podemos and AV failed to file the required documentation ahead of the legal deadline, both parties found themselves unable to be awarded full party rights within the coalition. The coalition partners have nevertheless downplayed the impact of that administrative decision as a 'technicality' that will not affect the course of the campaign.

Composition

Electoral performance

Parliament of Andalusia

Notes

References

2022 establishments in Andalusia
Political parties established in 2022
Political parties in Andalusia